Helsington is a civil parish in the South Lakeland District of Cumbria, England. It contains 21 listed buildings that are recorded in the National Heritage List for England. Of these, one is listed at Grade I, the highest of the three grades, one is at Grade II*, the middle grade, and the others are at Grade II, the lowest grade.  The parish includes the village of Brigsteer, and is otherwise rural.  The major listed buildings in the parish are Sizergh Castle and associated structures.  The other listed buildings include farmhouses, farm buildings, houses, bridges (two of them over dry parts of the Lancaster Canal), a church, a snuff mill, and buildings associated with a former gunpowder works.


Key

Buildings

References

Citations

Sources

Lists of listed buildings in Cumbria